Barranca Larga (Long Canyon) is a village and municipality within the Belén Department of Catamarca Province in northwestern Argentina.

References

Populated places in Catamarca Province